The Lord's Army may refer to many religion-oriented groups, most notably:

Lord's Resistance Army, an armed force in central Africa
Army of the Lord, a Romanian religious movement